The Pike Creek Hills, are a small range of hills  west of the community of Flatwillow in Petroleum and Fergus counties in Montana. The east end of the Little Snowy Mountains lie  to the west.

See also

References

Mountain ranges of Montana
Landforms of Petroleum County, Montana